Is the Pope Catholic? may refer to:

"Is the Pope Catholic?", a common rhetorical question, used to mean an emphatic yes
Sedevacantism, the view by some Traditionalist Catholics that the pope is not the true head of the Catholic Church